Fernando Kurniawan (born 5 June 1988) is an Indonesian male badminton player.

Personal life
His brother Fran Kurniawan also a professional badminton player. His hobbies are playing basketball, and automotive modified.

Career
He joined PB Djarum badminton club in 2003, and in 2006 he joined the Indonesia national badminton team. In 2008, he became the champion of the Smiling Fish International Series tournament in men's doubles event partnered with Lingga Lie. They also won Singapore Asian Satellite tournament after beat Chayut Triyachart and Danny Bawa Chrisnanta of Singapore with the score 21-12, 17-21, 21-19. He became the runner-up of the New Zealand Open Grand Prix tournament in men's doubles event after defeated by Chen Hung-ling and Lin Yu-lang of Chinese Taipei with the score 22-20, 21-10. He also became the semifinalist at the Macau Open Grand Prix Gold tournament in men's doubles event after defeated by Koo Kien Keat and Tan Boon Heong of Malaysia. He represented North Maluku at the National Sports Week tournament in men's doubles event partnered with Mohammad Ahsan. They won a silver medal after defeated by Tony Gunawan and Bambang Supriyanto of East Java in the final round with the score 21-19, 12-21, 22-20.

In 2009, he became the semifinalist at the Vietnam International Challenge and New Zealand Open Grand Prix tournaments in men's doubles event. At New Zealand, he and Lie lost to Hirokatsu Hashimoto and Noriyasu Hirata of Japan with the score 21-16, 17-21, 21-17. In 2010, he became the champion at the Vietnam International tournament in men's doubles event partnered with Wifqi Windarto after beat Patiphat Chalardchalaem and Nipitphon Puangpuapech with the score 21-19, 14-21, 21-13 in 45 minutes. He also became the runner-up of the White Nights tournament in Russia with Windarto. They lost the final match to their teammate Rian Sukmawan and Rendra Wijaya in rubber game 14-21, 21-13, 21-12.

In 2012, he started to representing Hong Kong in international tournament event. In 2014, he became the runner-up of the Vietnam International tournament in mixed doubles event partnered with Poon Lok Yan after defeated by Alfian Eko Prasetya and Annisa Saufika of Indonesia with the score 21-14, 21-17. He also became the semifinalist of the Osaka International tournament in mixed doubles event.

In 2015, he moved back to his home country Indonesia, and started to playing in national event. He won some titles at Djarum National Circuit partnered with Fran Kurniawan, Tedi Supriadi, and Marsheilla Gischa Islami.

Achievements

BWF Grand Prix 
The BWF Grand Prix has two level such as Grand Prix and Grand Prix Gold. It is a series of badminton tournaments, sanctioned by Badminton World Federation (BWF) since 2007.

Men's doubles

 BWF Grand Prix Gold tournament
 BWF Grand Prix tournament

BWF International Challenge/Series 
Men's doubles

Mixed doubles

 BWF International Challenge tournament
 BWF International Series tournament

References

External links
 
 Profile on PBSI

1988 births
Living people
Indonesian people of Chinese descent
Sportspeople from South Sumatra
People from Palembang
Indonesian male badminton players
Hong Kong male badminton players